Glen Hurst is a historic house, located at 4933 MacArthur Boulevard, Northwest, Washington, D.C., in the Palisades neighborhood.

History
It was designed by Richard Ough in 1892, and built by John C. Hurst.
The building is an example of Queen Anne style architecture. It is one of the five original houses in the Palisades.

It was added to the National Register of Historic Places on June 1, 2005. 
Glen Hurst currently serves as the office location of DC Living Real Estate, LLC.

References

Houses on the National Register of Historic Places in Washington, D.C.
The Palisades (Washington, D.C.)